Cardiac Arrest is a 1980 American slasher thriller film written and directed by Murray Mintz, and starring Garry Goodrow, Max Gail and Fred Ward.

Plot
The city of San Francisco is pushed into a state of terror and fear as a deranged murderer stalks the city. The police are baffled by the case and are led to extremes by a lunatic whose victims all have something in common: their hearts have been skillfully and surgically removed. Meanwhile, across town, a man must make a difficult decision regarding his wife, who needs a transplant.

Cast
 Garry Goodrow as Clancy Higgins
 Michael Paul Chan as Wylie Wong
 Max Gail as Leigh Gregory
 Susan O'Connell as Dianne Gregory
 Ray Reinhardt as Dr. Williams
 Robert Behling as Harvey Nichols
 Fred Ward as Jamie

References

External links
 
 
 

1980 films
1980 horror films
1980 thriller films
Films about organ trafficking
1980s English-language films